His/Her Worship the Mayor of Woollahra is the head of Woollahra Municipal Council, which is a local government area covering part of the Eastern Suburbs of Sydney in the State of New South Wales, Australia. First incorporated on 20 April 1860 as the Municipality of Woollahra, under the terms of the Municipalities Act of 1858, the first leaders of the Council were titled "Chairman" until the 1858 act was replaced by the Municipalities Act of 1867, which introduced the title of "Mayor". On 1 July 1993 following the enactment of a new Local Government Act, elected representatives of the council were to be known as "Councillor", replacing the former title of "Alderman".

The Mayor is internally-elected by the Councillors, and nominally serves a two-year term since 2017, which replaced the previous system of annual mayoral elections. The current Mayor of Woollahra is Councillor Susan Wynne (Liberal), first elected on 23 September 2019. The Mayor is assisted in their work by a Deputy Mayor, who is elected on an annual basis by the elected Councillors.

List of incumbents

Deputy Mayors
The position of Deputy Mayor was made a permanent council position under the Local Government Act 1919. The following individuals have been elected as Deputy Mayor of Woollahra:

Notes and references

External links
 Woollahra Municipal Council (Council website)

Woollahra
Mayors
Mayors Woollahra